Francisco "Paco" Sanchez d'Avolio (born 16 May 1986 in Baudour) is a retired Belgian football player.

Career

Club career
He began his career 1992 by CD Furia Espagnola Baudour, before 1994 scouted from R.S.C. Anderlecht, than joined to R. Francs Borains. 1995 signed a contract Standard Liège and moved 1999 to R.E. Mouscron, played there 8 years and moved on 31 January 2008 on loan to FCV Dender EH, in summer 2008 was sold from Dender.

Privates 
He also holds Spanish citizenship.

References

External links
 Footgoal Profile
 Voetbal International Profile
 Excelweb Profile

1986 births
Living people
Belgian footballers
Belgian people of Spanish descent
Royal Excel Mouscron players
F.C.V. Dender E.H. players
Standard Liège players
R.S.C. Anderlecht players
F91 Dudelange players
Belgium youth international footballers
Association football midfielders
Francs Borains players